Arthur Duray (9 February 1882 – 11 February 1954) was born in New York City of Belgian parents and later became a French citizen. An early aviator, he held Belgian license #3. He is probably best known today for breaking the land speed record on three separate occasions between July, 1903 and March, 1904. Driver George Stewart legally changed his name to Leon Duray in tribute to fellow driver Arthur Duray.

Indianapolis 500 results

Other race results (probably incomplete):

 1904 Eliminatoires Françaises de la Coupe Internationale DNF Gobron-Brillié
 1904 Circuit des Ardennes         6th Darracq
 1904 Coppa Florio                 5th Darracq
 1904 La Consuma Hillclimb         3rd Darracq 80 hp
 1905 Eliminatoires Françaises de la Coupe Internationale 3rd De Dietrich 24/28 (Vanderbilt qualifier)
 1905 Circuit des Ardennes         7th De Dietrich 24/28
 1905 Coppa Florio                 2nd Lorraine-Dietrich
 1905 Vanderbilt Cup               DNF De Dietrich 24/28
 1905 Gordon Bennett Cup           6th Lorraine-Dietrich
 1906 Circuit des Ardennes         1st De Dietrich 
 1906 French Grand Prix at LeMans  8th Lorraine-Dietrich (aggregate)
 1906 Vanderbilt Cup               3rd Lorraine-Dietrich
 1907 Dieppe                           DNF
 1907 Moscow-St.Petersburg             1st De Dietrich  
 1907 Kaiser Preis                 12th Lorraine-Dietrich with Fernand Gabriel Heat 1
 1907 Kaiser Preis                 4th Lorraine-Dietrich Heat 2
 1907 Kaiser Preis                 DNF Lorraine-Dietrich Final
 1907 French Grand Prix at Dieppe  DNF Lorraine-Dietrich (fastest lap 75.4 mph)
 1907 Coppa Velocita di Brescia    DNF (7th) Lorraine-Dietrich
 1907 Targa Florio                 4th Lorraine-Dietrich
 1908 Moscow-St.Petersburg             DNF Lorraine-Dietrich
 1908 Dieppe                           DNF Lorraine-Dietrich
 1908 Coppa Florio                 DNF Lorraine-Dietrich
 1908 American Grand Prize 10th    De Dietrich
 1911 French Grand Prix at Lyon    8th
 1911 French Grand Prix at LeMans  4th Lorraine-Dietrich
 1911 Coupe des Voiturettes        DNF Excelsior
 1912 French Grand Prix at Dieppe  10th Alcyon
 1912 Coupe de la Sarthe at LeMans 11th Alcyon
 1912 French Grand Prix at LeMans  10th Alcyon
 1913 French Grand Prix/Coupe de la Sarthe 5th Delage Y
 1914 Grand Prix at Lyon               8th Delage S
 1914 French Grand Prix at LeMans  4th
 1924 Coupe de L'Autodrome             2nd   D'Aoust Hispano-Suiza
 1924 Match des Champions              3rd   D'Aoust Hispano-Suiza
 1925 Spa 24 Hours                38th
 1926 24 Hours of Le Mans         37th   Ariès 5-8 CV
 1927 24 Hours of Le Mans         21st   Ariès 8-10 CV
 1928 24 Hours of Le Mans         30th   Ariès 8-10 CV
 1928 French Grand Prix at Saint-Gaudens ??
 1930 Belgian Grand Prix           4th   Ariès
 1931 Spa 24 Hours                13th B.N.C. (with Charlier, first in class)
 1933 Spa 24 hours                14th Amilcar C6 (with Jean de Gabardie, first in class)
 1934 24 Hours of Le Mans          ??  Amilcar

Land Speed Records
 1903 July 17        Ostend, Belgium  Gobron-Brillié :fr:Gobron-Brillié 'Paris-Madrid'
 1903 November 5     Dourdan, France  Gobron-Brillié 'Paris-Madrid'
 1904 March 31       Nice, France  Gobron-Brillié 'Paris-Madrid'

External links

 Article at historicracing.com

1882 births
1954 deaths
French racing drivers
Indianapolis 500 drivers
24 Hours of Le Mans drivers
American people of Belgian descent
Grand Prix drivers